Benza is a surname. Notable people with the surname include:

 A. J. Benza (born 1962), American gossip columnist and television host
 Scott Benza (born 1974), visual effects supervisor

See also
 Benzi